The 2016 United States House of Representatives election in Guam was held on Tuesday, November 8, 2016, to elect the non-voting Delegate to the United States House of Representatives from Guam's at-large congressional district. The election coincided with the elections of other federal and state offices, including the larger 2016 Guamanian general election, the 2016 United States House of Representatives elections, and the 2016 United States general elections.

The non-voting delegate is elected for a two-year term. Incumbent Democratic Delegate Madeleine Bordallo, who has represented the district since 2003, is seeking re-election for an 8th term. She announced her re-election campaign on January 24, 2016, at the Plaza de Espana in Hagåtña. She is being challenged by Republican Felix Perez Camacho, who served as the Governor of Guam from 2003 to 2011. The primary elections were held on Saturday, August 27, 2016.

Democratic primary

Candidates

Declared
 Anthony "Tony" Babauta, former Assistant Secretary of the Office of Insular Affairs
 Madeleine Bordallo, incumbent Delegate

Results

Republican primary

Candidates

Declared
 Felix Perez Camacho, former Governor of Guam
 Margaret Metcalfe, Republican National Committeewoman and nominee for Delegate in 2014

Results

General election

Polling
An election poll conducted by the University of Guam in September 2016 showed incumbent Delegate Madeleine Bordallo leading with 56%, while Republican Felix Camacho placed second with 44%.

Results
The general election was held on November 8, 2016.

References

Guam
2016
2016 Guam elections